The North American blizzard of 1996 was a severe nor'easter that paralyzed the United States East Coast with up to  of wind-driven snow from January 6 to January 8, 1996. The City University of New York reported that the storm "dropped 20 inches of snow, had wind gusts of 50 mph and snow drifts up to 8 feet high."
This storm was a classic example of a nor'easter, but the storm would not have been as historically significant without the presence of the arctic high pressure system located to the north of New York.  It was followed by another storm, an Alberta Clipper, on January 12, then unusually warm weather and torrential rain which caused rapid melting and river flooding in the Northeast Floods later that month. Along with the March Superstorm of 1993 and the January 2016 United States blizzard, it is one of only three snowstorms to receive the top rating of 5, or "Extreme", on the Northeast Snowfall Impact Scale (NESIS).

Impact

Virginia
 
Most of Virginia was impacted with the more central and western parts receiving  of snow. Roanoke got a record-breaking . Snowfall reached  in the Shenandoah Valley and exceeded  in much of the Virginia mountain and Piedmont areas. Gov. George Allen declared a state of emergency as power lines went down, people were trapped in their houses, and at least eight weather-related deaths occurred.

Washington, D.C. and Baltimore

Snow began falling on Washington, D.C. and Baltimore during the early afternoon of January 6, and continued at a consistent rate until mid-afternoon the next day.  At that time, the metro area received , and after a few hours of sleet and then a complete stop for several hours, it seemed the worst was over.  But overnight, as the storm slowly crawled northward, extremely heavy bands of snow came in from the east.  These bands created whiteout conditions as winds gusted past , along with thunder and lightning.
Baltimore received  and Washington Dulles International Airport received .

In DC, it was known as the "Blizzard of '96" or the "Great Furlough Storm," because it occurred just after the 1996 federal government shutdown and since the Federal government was closed due to the storm, lengthened the time federal employees were away from their jobs in the DC area.  Because of unseasonably warm weather in mid-January and a warm rain exceeding  on Monday, January 15, the snow melted quickly and caused the worst winter flooding in decades for river and stream valleys from Southwest Virginia to New York.

Philadelphia and Pennsylvania
 of snow fell in Philadelphia (as measured at the official city observation location, Philadelphia International Airport), the most of any major city in the storm's path. It remains the city's all-time greatest snowstorm, compared to its previous greatest snowstorm which was a "mere" . The mayor declared a state of emergency, and only police and other emergency workers were permitted to drive on city streets leaving the city to pedestrians.

For three days, city trucks loaded with plowed snow dumped their contents into the Schuylkill and Delaware rivers eventually causing major problems with the natural flow of the rivers. It is a rare occurrence for trucks to "dispose of snow" in the Philadelphia area, since the snowfall amounts typically do not warrant it. However the snow was so extensive, that plowing would cause massive snow piles. City officials had no choice but to resort to hauling the snow to nearby rivers. Disposal of snow became a major issue but temperatures quickly returned to normal and began to quickly clear the snow. Philadelphia saw its worst flooding in twenty years. Damages were estimated to reach US$1 billion.

New Jersey

Snow began falling during the predawn hours of the January 7 and became heavy at times during the morning. Blizzard conditions developed during the afternoon and evening as strong northeast winds developed around the intensifying low pressure. During the afternoon hours, precipitation in far southern New Jersey changed to sleet and freezing rain as the low brought in warm air at mid-levels, but remained all snow across the rest of the state. During the evening and overnight hours the snow mixed with sleet as far north as central sections of the state as the low center approached the state from the south. A lull developed in the precipitation in the pre-dawn hours of January 8 as the low center was just off the New Jersey coast, but wraparound moisture brought another period of snow to the state as the low pulled away during the later morning and early afternoon hours of the January 8.

In addition to the heavy snow, wind gusts reached hurricane force along the coast during the evening of the 7th, with an  gust recorded in Ocean Grove. Fortunately, winds switched to the northwest before worse flooding could occur at high tide on the morning of January 8.

The state of New Jersey recorded its second-largest snowstorm at Edison, where  fell (the greatest single storm record being  at Cape May in the Great Blizzard of 1899). Elizabeth, New Jersey, also reported  of snow. Newark, the state's largest city, received a record-setting , while Trenton, the capital, received . All roads in the state were closed, including the entire length of the New Jersey Turnpike for the first time in that road's history. Over two-thirds of the state was buried under  of snow, making this storm the state's most paralyzing snowstorm of the 20th century. New Jersey was, along with other states, put into a state of emergency.

"Two feet of snow was blasted into Greater Trenton by 50 mph winds that created giant drifts, paralyzing the region and the rest of the Northeast for a week, One writer called it the most “sadistic” storm of our century.
The Blizzard of '96 stranded hundreds of people at Trenton's train station; left thousands without electricity and heat for days; closed most schools and government offices for a week; cut off an estimated US$1 billion in Jersey commerce; forced the National Guard into service rescuing state troopers from snowbound police cruisers; and created strife between officials and residents demanding the plowing of their little streets. In the second week of January 1996, it can be said, many locales across the region looked like they did in the old pictures taken of them during the infamous Blizzard of '88: Houses drifted under; snowed-in main streets that looked like ghost towns; no cars or people on the streets."

New York City

Schools in New York City's boroughs closed because of snow for the first time since the Blizzard of 1978, 18 years earlier. While most suburban districts in the area close for snow several times each winter, in the city itself they rarely do because of relatively easy access to underground subways whose ability to run is not appreciably affected by snowstorms of moderate to large accumulation; however, in this snowstorm, the transit network was significantly disrupted. Buses were unable to run, and subway service was limited. Lines that ran in open cut and surface routes were shut down for two days.

New England

Providence, Rhode Island, received  of snow, while Boston and Hartford, Connecticut, both received . While this was a major snow event for southern New England, the Blizzard of 1996 was not as intense as other recent events, notably the Blizzard of 1978 and the March 1993 Superstorm. Snowfall amounts decreased sharply as one moved further north, with northern Vermont, New Hampshire, and Maine receiving little more than snow flurries from this event.

Blizzard status
During the afternoon of January 7, the airports recorded the necessary three consecutive hours of frequent wind gusts of at least  combined with a prevailing visibility consistently below  along with falling and blowing snow, meeting the official NWS standard of a blizzard. This indicates that the sites experienced some of the worst conditions on the entire East Coast. All other New Jersey observing sites, as well as most sites in neighboring states, failed to observe true blizzard conditions, though many stations did observe blizzard conditions for less than the necessary three consecutive hours.

Snowfall accumulation totals

See also 
 Blizzard
 January 2016 United States blizzard – Very similar blizzard that affected almost the same areas with identical snow totals 20 years after this one.
 Nor'easter

References

1996 meteorology
Blizzards in the United States
Nor'easters
1996 natural disasters in the United States
January 1996 events in North America